Dick Bradley (28 November 1924 - 30 October 2022) was an English speedway rider.

Speedway career 
Bradley was a leading speedway rider in the late 1950s. He reached the final of the Speedway World Championship on three occasions in the 1951 Individual Speedway World Championship, 1952 Individual Speedway World Championship and the 1953 Individual Speedway World Championship.

He rode in the top tier of British Speedway from 1948-1965, riding for various clubs.

Bradley died on 30 October 2022.

World final appearances

Individual World Championship
 1951 –  London, Wembley Stadium – Reserve - 2pts
 1952 –  London, Wembley Stadium – 7th – 9pts
 1953 –  London, Wembley Stadium – 15th – 2pts

References 

1924 births
2022 deaths
British speedway riders
Bristol Bulldogs riders
Newport Wasps riders
Southampton Saints riders
Sportspeople from Wiltshire